Lefroyella is a genus of glass sponges in the subfamily Euretinae, containing 2 species.

Species
 Lefroyella ceramensis Ijima, 1927
 Lefroyella decora Thomson, 1877

References

Sponge genera
Hexactinellida